The Tolowa Dee-ni' Nation, previously known as Smith River Rancheria, is a federally recognized tribe of Tolowa people in Del Norte County, California. They are Athabascan people, distantly related to northern Athabascans of eastern Alaska and western Canada, as well as the Apache and Navajo peoples of the American Southwest.

As of the 2010 Census the population of this group was 113. Tolowa people are also part of other federally recognized tribes in northern California and Oregon.

Government
The Tolowa Dee-ni' Nation is headquartered in Smith River, California. They are governed by a democratically elected, seven-member tribal council. Their current tribal administration is as follows:
 Chairperson: Jeri Lynn Thompson
 Vice Chairperson: Scott Sullivan
 Secretary: Debbie Boardman
 Treasurer: Jaytuk Steinruck
 Councilmember: Dr. Joseph Giovannetti
 Councilmember: Amanda O'Connell
 Councilmember: Dorothy Wait
 Executive Director: Troy Ralstin

Reservation
The Tolowa Dee-ni' Nation is a federally recognized tribe, which owns 805 acres of land on or adjacent to its reservation in Del Norte County, north of Crescent City. The Tolowa Dee-ni' Nation was established in 1906; their land used to consist of only 30-acres. The nearest community is Smith River, while the nearest incorporated city is Brookings, Oregon, about 10 miles to the north. In 1862, the US Government established the Smith River Reservation, which consisted of 16,000 acres and which was abandoned by the U.S. in 1868.

Economic development

The Tolowa Dee-ni' Nation (Smith River Rancheria) owns and operates the Lucky 7 Casino and Xaa-wan'-k'wvt Village Resort in Smith River, California.

Notable members
Eunice Bommelyn, Tolowa language proponent, cultural advocate, genealogist, and historian.
Loren Me'-lash-ne Bommelyn, linguist, educator, traditionalist, historian, genealogist, basket weaver
Dr. Joseph Giovannetti, professor, writer, lecturer, genocide expert, CSU Humboldt, Sports Hall of Fame, track & field
Drew Roberts, CSU Humboldt, Sports Hall of Fame, football
Jolanda Ingram Obie, attorney
Ron James, carver

Notes

External links
 Tolowa Dee-ni’ Nation, official website
 , Four Directions Institute

Tolowa
Native American tribes in California
Federally recognized tribes in the United States
Del Norte County, California
1906 establishments in California
Populated coastal places in California